Vallecito is an unincorporated community in La Plata County, Colorado, United States.

History
A post office called Vallecito was in operation between 1901 and 1942. Vallecito is a name derived from Spanish meaning "little valley".

See also

 Vallecito Dam

References

External links

Unincorporated communities in La Plata County, Colorado
Unincorporated communities in Colorado